Birch Township is a township in Beltrami County, Minnesota, United States. The population was 116 as of the 2000 census.

Birch Township was named for the canoe birch trees there from which Native Americans built canoes.

Geography

Lakes
 Anderson Lake
 Baumgartner Lake
 Chinaman Lake
 Coleman Lake
 Damon Lake
 Dollar Lake
 Ellis Lake
 Gilstad Lake (southeast three-quarters)
 Gimmer Lake
 Holland Lake
 Little Gilstad Lake
 Mud Lake
 Pimushe Lake (northeast edge)
 Rabideau Lake
 Webster Lake

Adjacent townships
 Summit Township (north)
 Moose Park Township, Itasca County (northeast)
 Third River Township, Itasca County (east)
 Moose Lake Township (south)
 Sugar Bush Township (southwest)
 Taylor Township (west)

Demographics
As of the census of 2000, there were 116 people, 44 households, and 34 families residing in the township. The population density was 3.4 people per square mile (1.3/km2). There were 55 housing units at an average density of 1.6/sq mi (0.6/km2). The racial makeup of the township was 93.10% White, 3.45% Native American, 0.86% from other races, and 2.59% from two or more races. Hispanic or Latino of any race were 6.90% of the population.

There were 44 households, out of which 29.5% had children under the age of 18 living with them, 72.7% were married couples living together, 2.3% had a female householder with no husband present, and 20.5% were non-families. 20.5% of all households were made up of individuals, and 6.8% had someone living alone who was 65 years of age or older. The average household size was 2.64 and the average family size was 3.06.

In the township the population was spread out, with 29.3% under the age of 18, 0.9% from 18 to 24, 27.6% from 25 to 44, 30.2% from 45 to 64, and 12.1% who were 65 years of age or older. The median age was 42 years. For every 100 females, there were 146.8 males. For every 100 females age 18 and over, there were 134.3 males.

The median income for a household in the township was $41,250, and the median income for a family was $42,500. Males had a median income of $36,250 versus $30,000 for females. The per capita income for the township was $18,474. There were no families and 1.5% of the population living below the poverty line, including no under eighteens and 9.5% of those over 64.

References
 United States National Atlas
 United States Census Bureau 2007 TIGER/Line Shapefiles
 United States Board on Geographic Names (GNIS)

Townships in Beltrami County, Minnesota
Townships in Minnesota